Petsburgh USA is an American television program about pets, that premiered in 1998 on Animal Planet.

It was hosted by Brianne Leary and was filmed at a soundstage in the Disney-MGM Studios at the Walt Disney World Resort in Lake Buena Vista, Florida. The first season taped 65 episodes. A second season, taped in 1999, also consisted of 65 episodes.

References

External links

Animal Planet original programming
1998 American television series debuts